Perizoma minorata, the heath rivulet, is a moth of the family Geometridae. The species was first described by Georg Friedrich Treitschke in 1828.

Etymology
The specific name minorata refers to the smaller size than the other species.

Subspecies
Subspecies include:
Perizoma minorata minorata
Perizoma minorata ericetata Stephens, 1831
Perizoma minorata norvegica Prout, 1906

Distribution and habitat
This species can be found in most of Europe.

Description

Perizoma minorata has a wingspan of 16–20 mm. It is an inconstant species and shows some local and some individual variation.

The name-typical form, as it occurs in the Alps, the mountains of Germany, Austria, southern France, etc., is the larger, paler race, the ground colour being clear white, the markings often pale, the distal area at times with only quite weak dark shading. Hindwing are whitish or very pale grey.

The subspecies Perizoma minorata ericetata, the only form known from Scotland, is considerably smaller, darker marked, the white band - distally to the median generally with a sharper dividing line, the hindwings are darker grey.

The subspecies Perizoma norvegica, from Norway, is as small as P. m. ericetata but otherwise forms a strong contrast to it, being more weakly marked than the name-type.  At last P. m. ab. monticola Strand is a rare aberration, with the median area not darkened at all, but only indicated by the lines which limit it. Mentioned from Norway and Scotland.

Biology
There is one generation per year with adults on wing from the end of June to August. This moth usually flies during the day, with preference for sunny afternoons.

The larvae feed on Euphrasia species. They feed on the developing seeds. The larvae can be found from August to September. This species overwinters as a pupa in the ground.

Bibliography
Merzheevskaya, O. I.; Litvinova, A. N. & Molchanova, R. V. (1976). "Tsheshuyekrylye (Lepidoptera) Belorussii". Katalog. Minsk. 131 pp.
Mironov, V. (2003). The Geometrid Moths of Europe, vol. 4 (Larentiinae: Perizomini & Eupitheciini). in Apollo Books, Stenstrup, 464 pp. & 16 colour pls. 
Lastuvka, Z. (1998). Seznam motylu Ceske a Slovenske republiky. [Checklist of Lepidoptera of the Czech and Slovak Republics (Insecta, Lepidoptera)]. Konvoj, Brno, 117 pp.
Pinker, R. (1968). Die Lepidopterenfauna Mazedoniens III Geometridae. in Posebno Izdanie. Prirodonaucen Muzej Skopje 4: 1-71.

References

External links

 Perizoma minorata - Biodiversity Heritage Library - Bibliography
 Paolo Mazzei, Daniel Morel, Raniero Panfili Moths and Butterflies of Europe and North Africa
 Kimmo Silvonen Larvae of North-European Lepidoptera
 Naturhistoriska risksmuseet 

Perizoma
Moths of Europe
Moths of Iceland
Taxa named by Georg Friedrich Treitschke
Moths described in 1828